Patrick Galen Dempsey (born January 13, 1966) is an American actor and racing driver. He is best known for his role as neurosurgeon Derek "McDreamy" Shepherd in Grey's Anatomy. He had early success as an actor, starring in a number of films in the 1980s, including Can't Buy Me Love (1987) and Loverboy (1989). 

In the 1990s, he mostly appeared in smaller roles in film, such as Outbreak (1995) and television. Dempsey was also in Scream 3 (2000) where he played the role of Detective Mark Kincaid. 

He was successful in landing a lead role in Sweet Home Alabama (2002), a surprise box office hit. He has since starred in other films, including Brother Bear 2 (2006), Enchanted (2007), Made of Honor (2008), Valentine's Day (2010), Flypaper (2011), Freedom Writers (2007), Transformers: Dark of the Moon (2011), and Bridget Jones's Baby (2016).

Dempsey, who maintains a sports car and vintage car collection, also enjoys auto racing in his spare time. He has competed in pro-am events such as the 24 Hours of Le Mans, Rolex 24 at Daytona sports car race, and Ensenada SCORE Baja 1000 off-road race. Prior to the 2013 24 Hours of Le Mans, Dempsey declared that he would "walk away" from acting if he could and dedicate himself full-time to motorsports.

Early life
Dempsey was born in Lewiston, Maine, and grew up in the nearby towns of Turner and Buckfield. He has two older sisters and a half-brother, Shane Wray. His mother, Amanda (née Casson), was a school secretary, and his father, William, was an insurance salesman.

He attended Buckfield High School and St. Dominic Regional High School, and after moving to Houston attended Willowridge High School.

In his youth, Dempsey participated in juggling competitions. In 1981, he achieved second place at the International Jugglers' Association Championship in the Juniors category, just behind Anthony Gatto, who is considered to be the best technical juggler of all time.

Dempsey was diagnosed with dyslexia at age 12. He told Barbara Walters on her 2008 Oscar special that he thinks dyslexia made him what he is today. "It's given me a perspective of — you have to keep working," Dempsey told Walters. "I have never given up."

Acting career

Early career
An invitation to audition for a role in the stage production of Torch Song Trilogy led to Patrick Dempsey's discovery as an actor. His audition was successful and he spent the following four months touring with the company in Philadelphia. He followed this with another tour, Brighton Beach Memoirs, in the lead role, which was directed by Gene Saks. Dempsey has also made notable appearances in the stage productions of On Golden Pond, with the Maine Acting Company, and as Timmy (the Martin Sheen role) in a 1990 off-Broadway revival of The Subject Was Roses co-starring with John Mahoney and Dana Ivey at the Roundabout Theatre in New York.

Dempsey's first major feature film role was at age 21 with Beverly D'Angelo in the film In The Mood, the actual World War II story about Ellsworth Wisecarver whose relationships with older married women created a national uproar. He then co-starred in the third installment of the comedy classic Meatballs III: Summer Job, alongside Sally Kellerman in 1987. This was followed by the teen comedy Can't Buy Me Love in 1987 with actress Amanda Peterson and Some Girls with Jennifer Connelly in 1988. In 1989, Dempsey had the lead role in the films Loverboy with actress Kirstie Alley and Happy Together with actress Helen Slater.

1990s and 2000s
Dempsey made several featured appearances in television in the 1990s; he was cast several times in pilots that were not picked up for a full season, including lead roles in the TV versions of the films The Player and About A Boy. He received positive reviews, however, as he portrayed real-life mob boss, Meyer Lansky in 1991 when Mobsters was put on the screen. His first major television role was a three-episode stint as Will Truman's closeted sportscaster boyfriend on Will & Grace. He appeared in four episodes of Once & Again as Aaron Brooks, the schizophrenic brother of Lily (Sela Ward). Dempsey received an Emmy nomination in 2001 as Outstanding Guest Actor in a Drama Series for the role of Aaron. In 1993, he played a young John F. Kennedy in the two-part TV mini-series JFK: Reckless Youth. In 2000, he played Detective Kincaid in Scream 3.

Dempsey had a high-profile role as the fiancé of Reese Witherspoon's character in Sweet Home Alabama (2002). In 2004, he co-starred in the highly acclaimed HBO production Iron Jawed Angels, opposite Hilary Swank and Anjelica Huston. He also appeared as special guest star in The Practice for its three-episode finale season (8x13-8x15).

In 2007, Dempsey starred in the Disney film Enchanted, and the Paramount Pictures film Freedom Writers, where he reunited with his Iron Jawed Angels co-star Hilary Swank. He also voiced the character Kenai in Brother Bear sequel Brother Bear 2, replacing Joaquin Phoenix. Dempsey's most recent roles include the 2008 film Made of Honor as Tom, and the 2010 romantic comedy Valentine's Day; the latter film follows five interconnecting stories about Los Angelinos anticipating (or in some cases dreading) the holiday of love.

Universal Pictures acquired the rights to the prize-winning novel The Art of Racing in the Rain in July 2009, for Dempsey to star in. The film instead starred Milo Ventimiglia. He starred as Dylan Gould in Transformers: Dark of the Moon (2011).

Grey's Anatomy

Dempsey has received significant public attention for his role as Dr. Derek "McDreamy" Shepherd in the medical drama Grey's Anatomy opposite Ellen Pompeo. Before landing the role, Dempsey auditioned for the role of Dr. Chase on another medical show, House. He also appeared in two episodes of the later Grey's spinoff Private Practice, playing the same character of Dr. Shepherd. The relationship his character had with Meredith Grey (Ellen Pompeo) on screen has received a lot of praise and positive reactions.

In January 2014, he signed a two-year contract to remain on Grey's Anatomy, then in its tenth season, that would ensure his participation for potential 11th and 12th seasons.

Dempsey was nominated for Best Actor – Television Series Drama at the 2006 Golden Globe Awards for the role. His success on the show has led to his becoming a spokesman for Mazda and State Farm Insurance. BuddyTV ranked him #1 on its list of "TV's Sexiest Men of 2011."

In November 2020, Dempsey appeared as Derek Shepherd at the start of the series' 17th season for the first time since the character had died in April 2015.

Further work
Following his departure from Grey's Anatomy, Dempsey was working on two small-screen projects: a drama The Limit for SundanceTV and a travelogue spy thriller called Fodors. He said: 

In 2016, Dempsey starred in the Universal Pictures film Bridget Jones's Baby with Renée Zellweger and Colin Firth, and in 2018 he appeared on Epix television miniseries The Truth About the Harry Quebert Affair.

On February 4, 2020, Dempsey signed on to star as the lead of a CBS political drama pilot Ways & Means, where he would portray a Congressional leader. Initially planned to be considered for the 2020-21 televisions season, the pilot was rolled into consideration for the following season due to the COVID-19 pandemic. CBS ultimately passed on the finished pilot in May 2021.  In January 2021, it was announced that Dempsey would reprise his role in the Enchanted sequel, Disenchanted, which began production in spring of that year. The film was released on Disney+ in late 2022.

Auto racing

In 2014, Dempsey told Reuters in the Hockenheimring support paddock at the German Grand Prix that motor racing was not just a hobby, and had become as much a part of who he is as acting. He said, "It's all-consuming in many ways. I couldn't imagine not racing right now. It really keeps me motivated. It's all I think about on a daily basis."

Dempsey, who maintains an extensive sports and vintage car collection, has enjoyed auto racing in his spare time for several years. Before the 24 Hours of Le Mans in 2013, he said that he would like to compete full-time, telling Eurosport:
I would like to make that [motorsports] a complete priority and just focus on this full-time. If I could just walk away from acting, I think I could do that very easily, and just focus on the driving, I would love that more than anything else.

He has competed in prestigious pro-am events such as the 24 Hours of Le Mans, Rolex 24 at Daytona sports car race, and Tecate SCORE Baja 1000 off-road race. He was a co-owner of the Vision Racing IndyCar Series team and current owner of Dempsey Racing, which is presently racing two Porsche 911 GT America's in the Tudor United Sports Car Series. He participated in this series as often as his schedule allowed, although insurance restrictions kept him from driving competitively while also filming a motion picture. In 2009, he raced a Team Seattle Advanced Engineering Ferrari F430 GT in the 2009 24 Hours of Le Mans's GT2 class and finished ninth in class.

Dempsey announced he would race the 2011 Rolex 24 at Daytona along with other races throughout the season in a Mazda RX-8.

Dempsey finished in third place in the GT Class of the Rolex 24 at Daytona. In 2012, Dempsey competed in the Grand-Am Continental Tire Sports Car Challenge behind the wheel of an Aston Martin Racing-Multimatic Motorsports Aston Martin Vantage GT4, which, after five successful racing seasons in Europe, was to make its debut on American tracks. He formed the Dempsey Racing team to compete in the American Le Mans Series. The team fielded a full-time Oreca FLM09 in the Prototype Challenge class as well as a Lola B12/80 coupe in the Prototype 2 class from Laguna Seca onward. 

After debuting at the 2009 24 Hours of Le Mans, Dempsey returned to France four years later and competed in a Porsche 997 GT3 RSR at the 2013 24 Hours of Le Mans endurance race. Dempsey and his co-drivers finished 29th overall and fourth in-class. 

In 2015, Dempsey focused on participating in the FIA World Endurance Championship with his own Dempsey Racing-Proton team in the GTE-Am class in a Porsche 997 GT3 RSR, teamed with Patrick Long and Marco Seefried. He told Porsche Newsroom: "Not much changes in my TV work, but everything changes constantly in motor racing – every lap, every bend and every moment."

Racing record

Career summary

 Not eligible for points.

24 Hours of Le Mans results

Complete Rolex Sports Car Series results
(key) (Results are overall/class)

 Did not complete sufficient laps in order to score points.

Complete Continental Tire Sports Car Challenge results
(key) (Results are overall/class)

‡ As Dempsey was a guest driver, he was ineligible to score points.

Complete Maserati Trofeo World Series results
(key)

‡ As Dempsey was a guest driver, he was ineligible to score points.

Complete American Le Mans Series results
(key) (Results are overall/class)

 Did not complete sufficient laps in order to score points.

Complete United SportsCar Championship results
(key) (Results are overall/class)

 Did not complete sufficient laps in order to score points.
* Season still in progress.

Complete Porsche Supercup results
(key)

‡ As Dempsey was a guest driver, he was ineligible to score points.

Complete FIA World Endurance Championship results

Other ventures

Promotional work
He has been the face of L'Oreal and Versace and was featured in ads for Serengeti sunglasses. In November 2008, he launched an Avon fragrance named Unscripted. In June 2009, Women's Wear Daily reported the launch of a second Avon fragrance named Patrick Dempsey 2. The fragrance was recognized as the "Men's Private Label/Direct Sell" for the 2010 FiFi Awards. On September 29, 2012, Mexican cable company Cablemás, Megacable and Mexico city's Cablevisión launched an advertising campaign featuring Dempsey as the love interest of a domestic worker who comes across his profile on an online dating site.

Starting in 2013, Patrick Dempsey became the face of Silhouette, promoting eyewear fashion from Austria. From January 2017 Dempsey appears for Vodafone Italy and he appears in some Italian spots about it. In 2018, Bleusalt, a Malibu-based fashion brand launched a clothing line designed by the actor.

Business interests

In January 2013, Dempsey announced that his company (Global Baristas) had secured the winning bid to purchase Seattle-based Tully's Coffee, which had filed for Chapter 11 bankruptcy protection in October. Dempsey's bid of $9.15M was enough to secure Tully's over the bids of six others, including Starbucks. Dempsey's company will control 47 Tully's locations in the Seattle area, but not the online business, which had been purchased by Green Mountain Coffee Roasters in 2009.

Following a legal dispute with investor group Global Baristas, Dempsey left the group, in effect officially leaving his managerial positions with Tully's. Dempsey filed a lawsuit on behalf of Global Baristas, claiming Michael Avenatti borrowed $2 million against Tully's assets without informing Dempsey, rather than fully financing the coffee chain as was promised, calling the 15 percent interest rate on the loan "exorbitant" and sued for Avenatti to fund Tully's operations and meet its working capital needs, as well as for any damages owed the company. Soon after, Dempsey's lawyer's office issued a statement saying the partnership was dissolved and that Dempsey wished the lawyer and the company "all the best". Avenatti has stated the dispute was a "misunderstanding" and will continue operating with other investors and new management.

Philanthropy
In 1997, Dempsey's mother, Amanda, was diagnosed with cancer which subsequently relapsed five times. On March 24, 2014, she died in Lewiston, Maine, aged 79. In response to his mother's bouts with cancer, Dempsey helped start the Patrick Dempsey Center at Central Maine Medical Center in Lewiston. In October 2009, when Dempsey introduced the first Dempsey Challenge, registration was closed after reaching the goal of 3,500 cyclists, runners and walkers. The event raised more than $1 million for the cancer center. His mother was in the crowd as Dempsey finished his  ride. The Challenge has since become an annual October event presented by Amgen in the Lewiston–Auburn area. On May 28, 2017, Dempsey received an honorary doctorate from Bates College in his hometown, Lewiston, Maine, for his philanthropy in the town and funding of "the Dempsey Center — just blocks from the Bates campus."

Dempsey was awarded an honorary doctorate by Bowdoin College in 2013 for his philanthropic work. His Grey's Anatomy character Derek Shepherd had been written as a Bowdoin graduate after an alumnus led a petition signed by over 450 students to "adopt" the character as an alumnus.

Personal life
Dempsey was diagnosed with dyslexia at age 12. As a result, it is necessary for him to memorize all his lines to perform, even for auditions where he is unlikely to get the part.

Entertainment Weekly put Dempsey's hair on its end-of-the-decade "best-of" list, saying, "What made Grey's Anatomy a mega-medi-hit? It could have something to do with creator Shonda Rhimes' scalpel-sharp writing… or McDreamy's impossibly luxurious man hair. Just saying." In 2005, People magazine ranked him second in its annual list of "Sexiest Men Alive" and again in 2006.

Dempsey has been married twice. On August 24, 1987, he married his manager, actress and acting coach, Rochelle "Rocky" Parker, when he was 21 and she 48. She appeared with Dempsey in the film In the Mood. While it has been reported that Dempsey married his best friend's mother, he has said that he became best friends with Parker's son only after he became romantically involved with Parker. The couple divorced on April 26, 1994. She died in 2014.

On July 31, 1999, Dempsey married Jillian Fink. The couple have three children. In January 2015, Fink filed for divorce, but the couple reconciled later in the year. They called off their divorce on November 12, 2016.

Dempsey is a supporter of Scottish football club Rangers F.C. because of his Scottish connection through his step-grandfather.

Filmography

Film

Television

Awards and nominations

In 2022 Dempsey was honored with a Disney Legend Award

References

External links

 
 
 
 
 
 
 

1966 births
Living people
Sportspeople from Lewiston, Maine
20th-century American male actors
21st-century American male actors
24 Hours of Daytona drivers
24 Hours of Le Mans drivers
Male actors from Maine
American male film actors
American male stage actors
American male television actors
American male voice actors
American car collectors
Rolex Sports Car Series drivers
IndyCar Series team owners
Jugglers
Racing drivers from Maine
American Le Mans Series drivers
American film producers
FIA World Endurance Championship drivers
WeatherTech SportsCar Championship drivers
Porsche Supercup drivers
Actors with dyslexia
People from Turner, Maine
People from Buckfield, Maine
Film directors from Maine
Multimatic Motorsports drivers
AF Corse drivers
Saint Dominic Academy (Maine) alumni